Mnich is a municipality and village in Pelhřimov District in the Vysočina Region of the Czech Republic. It has about 400 inhabitants.

Administrative parts
Villages of Chválkov, Dvořiště, Mirotín and Rutov are administrative parts of Mnich.

References

Villages in Pelhřimov District